This is a list of ports and harbors connecting to the Arctic Ocean.

North America

Europe

Iceland
 Akureyri, Iceland

Russia

 Arkhangelsk, Russia
 Belomorsk, Russia
 Dikson, Russia
 Dudinka, Russia
 Kandalaksha, Russia
 Igarka, Russia
 Murmansk, Russia
 Naryan-Mar, Russia
 Severomorsk, Russia
 Tiksi, Russia
 Pevek, Russia
 Vitino, Russia
 Sabetta, Russia

Norway

 Hammerfest, Norway
 Honningsvåg, Norway
 Kirkenes, Norway
 Tromsø, Norway
 Vardø, Norway

References and notes

References

Arctic